GMS (also known as the Growling Mad Scientists) were a Dutch psychedelic trance duo which has attained significant popularity, beginning in the early 1990s. Formed by Shajahan Matkin (also known as Riktam) and Joseph Quinteros (also known as Bansi) in the city of Amsterdam, located in the west of The Netherlands, the duo has attracted a large international fanbase. GMS founded Spun Records in 1999, the first psychedelic trance label in the United States and Ibiza, Spain.

In 2008, GMS left Spun Records  to further concentrate on their own careers and had created in 2009 a new label to release all of their music from their own various bands called Starbox Music.

They have sold over 350,000 copies worldwide. Director Tony Scott used GMS tracks in his films Man on Fire, Domino and Unstoppable.

GMS won the Psy-Trance award twice (in 2001 and 2009) at the DJ Awards in Ibiza, Spain.

Members

Riktam 
Shajahan Matkin (Riktam) was born in 1976 in Amsterdam Holland. He met his co-member Bansi in a coffee shop when he was 14 years old. When he was 15 he left school and went to India where he travelled to Goa to experience his first trance parties. After returning to Amsterdam in 1995 from another trip to India, he started making music with his friend Bansi. They created a group called the Growling Mad Scientists or GMS as it became known. Now he lives in Ibiza, Spain and DJs and produces live shows around the world at various functions.

Bansi 
Joseph Quinteros (Bansi) was born in Barcelona in 1976. He played the drums for six years, starting at the age of 11. He also played bass and guitar, since his father was a musician. At 14 he met Riktam and after going to Goa together they founded GMS. He also lived in Ibiza and toured the world on a constant basis. He died on 19 June 2018 at the age of 42 from blood cancer.

Discography

Albums
Studio albums
 Chaos Laboratory (1997)
 The Growly Family (1998)
 GMS vs Systembusters (1999)
 Tri-Ball University (2000)
 The Hitz (2000)
 No Rules (2002)
 Emergency Broadcast System (2005)
 The G.M.S. Experiment (2021)

Remix albums
 Top of The TIPs 94-98 (TIP Records, 1998)
 The Remixes (Spun, 2003)
 The Remixes Vol2 (Starbox, 2009)
 Tampered Diversity (Future Music Records, 2018)

Compilation albums
 Genetic Process (Spun, 2002)
 Genetic Process "Part Dose" (Spun, 2002)
 Spunout (Spun, 2003)
 Pressure (Spun, 2003)
 Zero-1 (Spun, 2003)
 Hypernova (Spun, 2004)
 XXL (Spun, 2004)
 Remote Viewing (Spun, 2005)
 Zero Gravity (Spun, 2005)
 The Outer Limits (Spun, 2005)
 Spunout in Ibiza (Spun, 2007)

 Remixes
 Major7 & Vini Vici - "Back Underground" (GMS Remix)

Recognitions

Awards
 Ibiza DJ Awards
 2001 Best International DJ Psychedelic Trance
 2009 Best International DJ Psychedelic Trance

References

External links
 Growling Mad Scientists Official Site
 Growling Mad Scientists at MySpace
 Growling Mad Scientists at SoundCloud

Ableton Live users
Remixers
Electronic music duos
Musical groups established in 1995
Musical groups disestablished in 2018
Psychedelic trance musicians
Goa trance musical groups